Claudia Moro Fernández (born November 10, 1985, in Santiago de Compostela) is a Spanish model and beauty pageant titleholder who competed in the 2008 Miss Universe pageant, placing seventh overall.

Miss Spain
She represented Madrid at Miss Spain 2008 and placed first runner-up to Patricia Yurena Rodríguez.

Miss Universe
Moro was sent to Miss Universe 2008 due to Rodríguez being underage  and finished in the Top 10 (7th overall).

References

External links
Claudia Moro - Official website
Claudia Moro at NBC's Miss Universe Site

Living people
Spanish female models
Miss Universe 2008 contestants
1985 births
People from Santiago de Compostela
Miss Spain winners